Sang Sara may refer to:
 Sang Sara, Gilan
 Sang Sara, Mazandaran